Serious Samurize (or simply Samurize) is a freeware system monitoring and desktop enhancement engine for Microsoft Windows.

The core of Samurize is the desktop client that displays PC statistics (similar to a widget or gadget) anywhere on the screen. There is also a taskbar client, a clock client, a server, and a screensaver.  The client's main purpose is to display information about the computer, such as CPU usage, available RAM/HD space, network conditions, uptime, etc.. It can also be extended by using VBScript, JScript, Perl, Python, Ruby scripts and DLL plugins, which provide virtually unlimited possibilities. There are scripts and plugins which can get weather reports, news headlines, music controllers, etc..

Samurize includes a WYSIWYG config editor used to create the configs. A "config" consists of a collection of "meters", and is saved into an INI file in the "configs" folder of the Samurize installation path. "Configs" can be packed to be shared with other users by using an included tool.

History 
Work on Samurize started early in 2002. The first iteration of Samurize was version 0.63c, at which point work began on Serious Samurize, which was released at version 0.80a, breaking compatibility with older configurations.

The earliest predecessor of Samurize was NMeter, created in 2000. NMeter was followed by CureInfo in 2001 and in March 2002 Samurize development began. The development proceeded rapidly with almost one new version each month until version 1.0 was published in November 2003. Then the development process slowed somewhat but new versions were regularly released.

In early 2015, it was announced "that the samurize project is officially over." (sic)

References

External links 
 

Windows-only freeware
Widget engines